François Borde (8 December 1899 – 15 December 1987) was a French rugby union player who competed in the 1920 Summer Olympics. He was born in Lourdes and died in Bayonne. In 1920 he won the silver medal as member of the French team.

References

External links
dataOlympics profile
profile 

1899 births
1987 deaths
People from Lourdes
French rugby union players
Olympic rugby union players of France
Rugby union players at the 1920 Summer Olympics
Olympic silver medalists for France
France international rugby union players
Stade Toulousain coaches
Medalists at the 1920 Summer Olympics
Sportspeople from Hautes-Pyrénées